"Middleman" is a song by English rock band Terrorvision, which was released in June 1994 as the second single from their second studio album How to Make Friends and Influence People. The song was written by Terrorvision and produced by Gil Norton. "Middleman" reached No. 25 in the UK Singles Chart and remained in the Top 100 for five weeks. The song's music video was directed by Tim Royes and produced by Alan Wachs.

Critical reception
On its release as a single, Alan Jones of Music Week chose "Middleman" as the "pick of the week". He considered the song to be a "tuneful rock record", which he felt showed the band moving "closer to the mainstream". He noted the song as being "tastefully decorated by strings" and added, "It is not so very far removed from the style of ELO in the Seventies, with some of Jeff Lynne's vocal devices also coming into play." Music & Media felt the song "could have been a Troggs tune". They added, "Streetwise as these lads are, they don't turn down their amplifiers. Brilliant!"

Track listing
12-inch single (limited edition)
"Middleman" – 3:32
"Surrender" – 4:24
"The Passenger" – 4:57

Cassette single (UK)
"Middleman" – 3:32
"Oblivion" – 3:03

CD single (UK #1)
"Middleman" – 3:32
"I'll Be Your Sister" – 2:33
"Wishing Well" – 2:29

CD single (UK #2)
"Middleman" – 3:32
"The Passenger" – 4:57
"Surrender" – 4:24

CD single (UK promo)
"Middleman" (Radio Edit) – 3:35

CD single (European release)
"Middleman" – 3:32
"The Passenger" – 4:57

Personnel
Credits are adapted from the UK CD1 and CD2 liner notes and the How to Make Friends and Influence People booklet.

Terrorvision
 Tony Wright – vocals
 Mark Yates – guitar
 Leigh Marklew – bass
 Ian "Shutty" Shuttleworth – drums

Additional musicians
 Audrey Riley – string arrangement and backing vocals on "Middleman"
 Billy McGhee – string arrangement on "Middleman"

Production
 Gil Norton – producer and mixing on "Middleman"
 Al Clay – engineer on "Middleman"
 Mike Cyr – assistant engineer on "Middleman"
 Chris Sheldon – mixing on "Middleman"
 Terrorvision – producers on "I'll Be Your Sister", "Wishing Well", "Surrender" and "The Passenger"

Charts

References

1994 songs
1994 singles
Terrorvision songs
EMI Records singles
Song recordings produced by Gil Norton
Music videos directed by Tim Royes